The Deborah and Franklin Tepper Haimo Awards for Distinguished College or University Teaching of Mathematics are awards given by the Mathematical Association of America to recognize college or university teachers "who have been widely recognized as extraordinarily successful and whose teaching effectiveness has been shown to have had influence beyond their own institutions." The Haimo awards are the highest teaching honor bestowed by the MAA. The awards were established in 1993 by Deborah Tepper Haimo and named after Haimo and her husband Franklin Haimo. After the first year of the award (when seven awards were given) up to three awards are given every year.

Winners
The winners of the award have been:

1993: Joseph Gallian, Robert V. Hogg, Anne Lester Hudson, Frank Morgan, V. Frederick Rickey, Doris Schattschneider, and Philip D. Straffin Jr.
1994: Paul Halmos, Justin Jesse Price, and Alan Tucker
1995: Robert L. Devaney, Lisa Mantini, and David S. Moore
1996: Thomas Banchoff, Edward M. Landesman, and Herbert Wilf
1997: Carl C. Cowen, Carl Pomerance, and T. Christine Stevens
1998: Colin Adams, Rhonda Hatcher, and Rhonda Hughes
1999: Joel Brawley, Robert W. Case, and Joan Hutchinson
2000: Arthur T. Benjamin, Donald S. Passman, and Gary W. Towsley
2001: Edward Burger, Evelyn Silvia, and Leonard F. Klosinki
2002: Dennis DeTurck, Paul Sally, and Edward Spitznagel Jr.
2003: Judith Grabiner, Ranjan Roy, and Paul Zeitz
2004: Thomas Garrity, Andy Liu, and Olympia Nicodemi
2005: Gerald L. Alexanderson, Aparna Higgins, and Deborah Hughes Hallett
2006: Jacqueline Dewar, Keith Stroyan, and Judy L. Walker
2007: Jennifer Quinn, Michael Starbird, and Gilbert Strang
2008: Annalisa Crannell, Kenneth I. Gross, and James A. Morrow
2009: Michael Bardzell, David Pengelley, and Vali Siadat
2010: Curtis Bennett, Michael Dorff, and Allan J. Rossman
2011: Erica Flapan, Karen Rhea, and Zvezdelina Stankova
2012: Matthew DeLong, Susan Loepp, and Cynthia Wyels
2013: Matthias Beck, Margaret M. Robinson, and Francis Su
2014: Carl Lee, Gavin LaRose, and Andrew Bennett
2015: Judith Covington, Brian Hopkins, and Shahriar Shahriari
2016: Satyan Devadoss, Tyler Jarvis, and Glen Van Brummelen
2017: Janet Barnett, Caren Diefenderfer, and Tevian Dray
2018: Gary Gordon, Hortensia Soto, and Ron Taylor
2019: Suzanne Dorée, Carl Lee, and Jennifer Switkes
2020: Federico Ardila, Mark Tomforde, and Suzanne Weekes
2021: Dave Kung, David Austin, and Elaine Kasimatis
2022: Pamela E. Harris, Darren Narayan, and Robin Wilson

See also

 List of mathematics awards

References

Mathematics education awards
American awards
Awards established in 1991
1991 establishments in the United States
Awards of the Mathematical Association of America